Full Records is a Reggaeton record label TheFullxaosRecords located in Bayamón, Puerto Rico. Notable artists on this label are Yaga & Mackie, Arcángel, Ñengo Flow, L.T. "El Único," and Tony Tone. Full Records has a reality show on YouTube.

Diego Sanchez (Bogota Colombia)

Producers
 "El Pequeño" Yampi
 Shadow "La Sombra"
 Sequence
 Nixon "El Astronauta"

Sound Engineers
Sequence

Labels distributed by Universal Music Group